Population Media Center (PMC) is an entertainment organization dedicated to women's rights and empowerment, population stabilization, and the environment. PMC's TV and radio shows have promoted important social and cultural changes and have helped 500 million people in more than 50 countries.

PMC's headquarters staff and offices are located throughout the United States and abroad, including Los Angeles, Montreal, and Cape Town, with the primary office located in South Burlington, Vermont.

Its vision statement is "A sustainable planet with equal rights for all." Its mission statement is "To use entertainment-education and mass media to promote social and cultural change by addressing the interconnected issues of the full rights of women and girls, population, and the environment. PMC's goals are to empower people to live healthier and more prosperous lives and to stabilize global population at a level at which people can live sustainably with the world's renewable resources."

History 
PMC was founded in 1998 by William Ryerson to address population and reproductive health issues using the Sabido method. The company received funding from the Mulago Foundation in 2010.

Organization

Activities

US Content Studio 
In the United States, PMC develops and produces original content designed to entertain and address contemporary social issues, including women and girl's empowerment, reproductive health, and environmental sustainability. PMC's multi-Emmy Award® nominated series, East Los High, was one of the top five shows on Hulu during its first season and  27,000+ viewers used a Planned Parenthood widget in the first month of release.

International Programs 
PMC hires local writers, actors, and production staff, as well as administrative staff, to create powerful radio and TV serial dramas for behavior change. This approach is not only essential for riveting stories enmeshed in local language, traditions, and understanding, but also a key component to building capacity within the countries where PMC works, strengthening the in-country skills and human resources for developing future behavior change communications for social change.  

Since its inception, PMC has aired its shows in Argentina, Bolivia, Brazil, Burkina Faso, Burundi, Chile, Colombia, Costa Rica, Côte d’Ivoire, Democratic Republic of the Congo, Dominican Republic, Eastern Caribbean, Ecuador, El Salvador, Ethiopia, Guatemala, Haiti, Honduras, Jamaica, Kenya, Kyrgyzstan, Malawi, Mali, Mexico, Nepal, Nicaragua, Niger, Nigeria, Papua New Guinea, Panama, Paraguay, Peru, Philippines, Puerto Rico, Rwanda, Senegal, Sierra Leone, South Africa, Sudan, Swaziland, United States of America, Uganda, Uruguay, Venezuela, Vietnam, Zambia and Zimbabwe.

Leadership 
PMC's board of directors has included leading proponents of family planning, gender equality and reproductive health, as well as writers, producers and executives of network television and independent film companies.

Notable board members include:

 Anne H. Ehrlich and Paul R. Ehrlich (co-authors of the 1968 book The Population Bomb)
 Tom Sawyer (former Congressional Representative from Ohio)

Funding 
As a registered nonprofit 501(c)(3) organization, PMC receives donations from corporations, individuals, philanthropic organizations and government agencies. Donors include:

See also 

Entertainment-Education
Miguel Sabido
Public service announcement
Social and Behavior Change Communication
Social Impact Entertainment
Telenovelas
East Los High
Vencer el miedo

References

External links
 PMC website
WHO page about PMC
$350,000 MacArthur grant

Reproductive rights
Organizations based in Burlington, Vermont
Population concern advocacy groups
Population concern organizations
Population research organizations
Research institutes established in 1998
1998 establishments in Vermont